Waters–Fulton Store and Post Office, also known as Water's Store, Fulton, is a historic home located in Fulton, Howard County, Maryland.

The Post office and Store served as the center of town for Fulton, Maryland. It is situated on a slave plantation purchased by Richard Waters in 1861. On 29 December 1874 the "Water's Store" post office opened. In 1877 a road was commissioned by the county between Water's store and Souder House. In 1887 Frederick Brinkman purchased the farm and store. The Post Office name was changed to "Fulton" in 1887.

See also
List of Howard County properties in the Maryland Historical Trust
Clark's Elioak Farm
Fairfield Farm
MacAlpine

References

Houses completed in 1865
Howard County, Maryland landmarks
Houses in Howard County, Maryland